Ryan McNish (born March 7, 1981 in Winnipeg, Manitoba) is a retired lacrosse player, in the National Lacrosse League. McNish played for the Calgary Roughnecks between the 2005 and 2008 NLL seasons before being traded to the Edmonton Rush in 2009, where he played for three seasons. McNish also served as an aviation technician with 408 Tactical Helicopter Squadron, based in CFB Edmonton.

On November 17, 2011, Ryan signed a one-year deal with the Calgary Roughnecks  but was later released by the team on December 22, 2011.

In 2018 he was inducted into the Manitoba Lacrosse Hall of Fame.

Statistics

NLL

References

1981 births
Living people
Calgary Roughnecks players
Canadian lacrosse players
Edmonton Rush players
Royal Canadian Air Force personnel
Sportspeople from Winnipeg